Canazei (Ladin: Cianacéi) is a comune (municipality) in Trentino in the northern Italian region Trentino-Alto Adige/Südtirol, located in the upper part of the Val di Fassa, about  northeast of Trento. Its name derives from the Latin word cannicetus (cane thicket).

Demographics
In the census of 2001, 1,498 inhabitants out of 1,818 (82.4%) declared Ladin as their native language.

Main sights
 Chiesetta della Madonna della Neve. This church, dedicated to Our Lady of the Snow, is located at Gries, one of the Canazei hamlets, and was built in 1595; it has an onion-domed bell tower, while on the southern facade  is an image of S. Christopher, painted in the 18th century.
 Chiesetta di San Floriano, a church in the centre of the village. It was built in 1592.

Sport
Canazei is the base station for  excursions and rock climbs to the Sella, Marmolada and Sassolungo Groups.

The comune is represented in ice hockey's Alps Hockey League by HC Fassa Falcons who play at the Stadio del Ghiaccio Gianmario Scola. Canazei co-hosted the 1994 World Ice Hockey Championships with Bolzano and Milan.

Culture
Events in the town include:
 Gran Festa da d'Istà (Great Summer Feast - in Ladin): on the first Sunday in September with traditional folk parade
 Te Anter i Tobiè: on the second week-end in July

References

External links 
Canazei on The Campanile Project

Cities and towns in Trentino-Alto Adige/Südtirol
Ladinia